Société Bancaire du Liban S.A.L. (former Banque Zilkha) was a Lebanese bank, founded in 1958, and headquartered in Sassine square, Achrafieh, Beirut. The bank was founded by the Bashi and Lawi families. On 31 December 2002, the bank merged into First National Bank SAL.

References

See also
 Banque Zilkha

1958 establishments in Lebanon
2002 disestablishments in Lebanon
Banks established in 1958
Banks disestablished in 2002
Defunct companies of Lebanon
Banks of Lebanon
Companies based in Beirut